The Roman Catholic Diocese of Mackenzie–Fort Smith is a Latin Church ecclesiastical territory or diocese of the Catholic Church that includes the Northwest Territories, the northern extremity of Saskatchewan and the extreme west of the Territory of Nunavut in Canada. Bishop Jon Hansen,C.Ss.R. currently serves as Bishop of Mackenzie – Fort Smith, Canada.

Originally created in 1901 as the Vicariate Apostolic of Mackenzie, it was elevated to a full episcopal see in 1967.

As of 2004, the diocese contained 46 parishes and missions, 4 active diocesan priests, 7 religious priests, and 28,540 Catholics.  At the time, it also had 16 women religious, 8 religious brothers, and 3 permanent deacons. One famous parish is Our Lady Of Victory Church in Inuvik.

Bishops

Diocesan bishops
Vicariate Apostolic of Mackenzie
 Gabriel-Joseph-Elie Breynat, O.M.I. (1901–1943), "The Bishop of the Winds", Titular Bishop of Adramyttium (1901) and Titular Archbishop of Garella (1939)
 Joseph-Maria Trocellier, O.M.I. (1943–1958) 
 Paul Piché, O.M.I. (1959–1967)

The following is a list of the bishops of Mackenzie-Fort Smith and their terms of service:
Paul Piché (1967–1986)
Denis Croteau (1986–2008)
Murray Chatlain (2008–2012), appointed Archbishop of Keewatin-Le Pas, Manitoba
Mark Hagemoen (2013–2017), appointed Bishop of Saskatoon, Saskatchewan
Jon Hansen,C.Ss.R. (December 15, 2017)

Coadjutor bishops
 Pierre-Armand-Albert-Lucien Fallaize, O.M.I. (1931-1939), as Coadjutor Vicar Apostolic; did not succeed to see
 Joseph-Marie Trocellier, O.M.I. (1941-1943), as Coadjutor Vicar Apostolic
 Murray Chatlain (2007-2008)

References
Diocese of Mackenzie-Fort Smith page at catholichierarchy.org retrieved July 14, 2006
Press release from the Canadian Conference of Catholic Bishops at cccb.ca  retrieved May 19, 2008

Mackenzie-Fort Smith
Organizations based in the Northwest Territories
Christian organizations established in 1901
Roman Catholic dioceses and prelatures established in the 20th century
1901 establishments in Canada